Set the House on Fire is the second studio album released by Norwegian musician Moddi. The album released on 8 March 2013 through Propeller Recordings in Norway. The album peaked at No. 10 on the Norwegian Albums Charts. The album includes the single "House By the Sea" and "Run to the Water".

Singles
"House By the Sea" was released as the lead single from the album on 11 January 2013. "Run to the Water" was released as the second single from the album on 1 March 2013. "Silhouette" was released as the third single from the album on 20 March 2015.

Track listing

Chart performance

Weekly charts

Release history

References

2013 albums
Moddi albums